Luis Miguel Castro (November 25, 1876 – September 24, 1941) was a baseball player who was born in Medellín, Colombia. According to Major League Baseball, he was the first Latin American to enter the league as an infielder who played 42 games with the Philadelphia Athletics in the 1902 season.

A second baseman and right-handed batter, Castro attended Manhattan College and played for the Jaspers baseball team. He played his one and only major league season with the 1902 American League champion Philadelphia Athletics. In his brief 42-game stint, he posted a .245 batting average, with one home run and 15 runs batted in, 35 hits, 18 runs scored, 8 doubles, 1 triple and two stolen bases in 143 at bats.

Late life and death

Castro received economic assistance during his old age. The official data from this office showed his birthplace as New York City. After the S.S. Colon log, it is assumed that Castro probably wanted to pass for an American citizen by birth, in order to receive economic benefits from the Association and to avoid any kind of discrimination.

Several baseball databases such as baseball-reference.com and baseball-almanac.com, changed his birthplace to New York, but the discovery of the ship's information and passenger list provides a solid and perhaps irrefutable proof about his immigration to America. Despite the fact that he was not the first player who was brought by a team to play in the Major Leagues, Castro is recognized and credited as the first Major League Baseball player ever born in a Latin American country.

Castro died in New York City at the age of 64. Leonte Landino and Juan Vene confirmed that Castro is buried with no tombstone on an unidentified space at St. Mary's cemetery in Queens, New York, as reflected on Vene's book "Las mejores anécdotas del béisbol" (Ediciones B, Venezuela, 2008. 212p. – (1 ed)).  According to Landino's research on "La Prensa del Beisbol Latino", a SABR publication, Castro is at Division 10, row 9, number 18 in this cemetery.

On July 20, 2021, Queens State Senator Jessica Ramos unveiled a new tombstone for the first Latino to play in Major League Baseball on Colombian Independence Day, at Mount St. Mary Cemetery in Flushing.

See also
 List of players from Colombia in Major League Baseball

References

External links

 Remembering Luis Castro, the first Latino in MLB at Major League Baseball
 MLB players born in Colombia at Baseball Reference
 Famous First Foreign Players at Baseball Almanac
 Page at Latino Sports Legends

1876 births
1941 deaths
Sportspeople from Medellín
Major League Baseball second basemen
Philadelphia Athletics players
Minor league baseball managers
Atlanta Crackers players
Auburn Maroons players
Augusta Tourists players
Baltimore Orioles (IL) players
Birmingham Barons players
Kansas City Blues (baseball) players
Manhattan Jaspers baseball players
Nashville Vols players
New London Whalers players
Norwich Witches players
Portland Browns players
Portsmouth Pirates players
Utica Pent Ups players
Colombian emigrants to the United States
Major League Baseball players from Colombia
Colombian people of Spanish descent
American sportspeople of Colombian descent
Burials in Queens, New York, by place